The Chief Justice of Barbados is the head of the Supreme Court of Barbados as defined by the constitution.

The constitution of Barbados states:
80.1 There shall be for Barbados a Supreme Court of Judicature, consisting of a High Court and a Court of Appeal, with such jurisdiction, powers and authority as may be conferred upon those Courts respectively by this Constitution or any other law.
80.2 The judges of the Supreme Court shall be the Chief Justice and such number of Puisne Judges as may be prescribed by Parliament 
81.1 The Chief Justice shall be appointed by the Governor General, by instrument under the Public Seal, on the recommendation of the Prime Minister after consultation with the leader of the Opposition.

The first Chief Justice of Barbados and St Lucia, Sir R Bowcher Clarke, took office on 13 December 1841. In 2011 Justice Marston Gibson was appointed the 13th incumbent.

List of Chief Justices
1841–1874  Sir Robert Bowcher Clarke (also Chief Justice of St Lucia, 1850–59) 
1874–1886  Sir Charles Packer 
1886–1902  Sir William Conrad Reeves
1902–1925 Sir Herbert Greaves 
1925–1926 Richard Theodore Orpen 
1926–1936 Sir Robert Howard Furness 
1936–1957 Sir Ernest Allan Collymore 
1957–1958 Sir Stanley Eugene Gomes (afterwards Chief Justice of Trinidad and Tobago, 1958)
1959–1965 Sir Kenneth Sievewright Stoby
1965–1986 Sir William Randolph Douglas
Barbados became independent, 1966
1987–2001 Sir Denys Ambrose Williams
2002–2010 Sir David Anthony Cathcart Simmons
2011–2020 Sir Marston C.D. Gibson  
2020–Present Sir Patterson Keith Herman Cheltenham

References

Chief justices of Barbados